The Race is a political thriller written by Richard North Patterson. It is set during the 2008 presidential election in the United States, and revolves around fictional Ohioan Senator Corey Grace and his quest to become the Republican presidential nominee.

Main characters
Corey Grace, the protagonist, is the Republican Senator from Ohio, was a fighter pilot in the beginning of the book. He became a P.O.W. and was later awarded the Purple Heart. He was not close to his family and became a senator after the war; he particularly appealed to veterans of the war. He dates a black actress named Lexie Hart throughout the book.
Rob Marotta is the Senate Majority Leader who attempts to win the presidency through power, money, and manipulation.
Bob Christy is a Republican governor and religious fanatic, who presents himself as a "Messenger from God". He is liked by religious Catholics and  has a strong backing from religious fanatics, in general.

References

2007 American novels
American thriller novels
Novels about elections